Jacques André Aschenbroich (born 3 June 1954) is the CEO of Valeo. He is married and is the father of three children.

Biography
After holding different posts in the French civil service, he was a member of the Prime Minister's cabinet in 1987 and 1988. He then moved into industry and was with the Saint-Gobain Group from 1988 to 2008. He directed the Group's subsidiaries in Brazil and Germany before becoming managing director of the Flat Glass Division of the Compagnie de Saint-Gobain. He went on to become President of Saint-Gobain Vitrage in 1996. From October 2001 to December 2008, he was Senior Vice-president of Saint-Gobain, managing the Flat Glass and High Performance Materials sectors from January 2007, and the Group's operations in the United States from September 2007.

An acknowledged specialist in the industry, he was appointed CEO and Member of the Board of the automotive parts maker Valeo in 2009. Since March 2009, he has implemented a new strategic plan to ensure the Group's growth in two strategic directions: technologies for reducing  emissions and emerging markets. He has launched a reorganisation of the Group around 4 main Business Groups: Comfort & Driving Assistance Systems, Powertrain Systems, Thermal Systems, and Visibility Systems.

Education
 Baccalauréat at the Lycée Ampère in Lyon
 Preparatory classes for the "Grandes écoles" at the Lycée du Parc in Lyon
 École nationale supérieure des mines de Paris (Engineer's degree)
 Engineer of the “Corps of Mines”

Career
 1982: Deputy Regional Director, responsible for the Industrial Development Division at the Industry and Research Regional Management for Lorraine
 1983-1985: "Chargé de mission" for Economic Problems to the Prefect, Commissioner of the Republic for the Lorraine region, and deputy regional delegate for the Agence nationale de la valorisation et de la recherche (Anvar)
 1985-1987: "Chargé de mission" at the Délégation à l'aménagement du territoire (Datar)
 1985-1986: Secretary general of the Interministerial Committee for Assistance in localising activities (Ciala) for the Datar
 1986-1987 : Team Coordinator for localising industrial and tertiary activities for the
 1987-1988: Technical adviser for industrial affairs in the Prime Minister’s cabinet
 1989-1991: General Manager of Sama (Saint Gobain Group)
 1989-1991: Secretary general of Brasilit (Saint Gobain Group)
 1991-1993: Member of the supervisory board and General Manager of the Building Division of Végla (Saint Gobain Group)
 1993-1996: Chairman of the supervisory board of Végla (Saint Gobain Group)
 1994 : CEO of Sekurit Saint-Gobain international (Saint Gobain Group)
 1996-2007: Chairman and CEO of Saint-Gobain Vitrage and General Manager of the Flat Glass Division
 2001-2008 : Senior Vice-president of the Saint Gobain Group
 2007-2008: General Manager of the Flat Glass, High Performance Materials and Innovation Divisions of the Saint-Gobain Group
 2007-2008: General delegate for the United States and Canada for the Saint-Gobain Group
 Since 2009: CEO of Valeo

Other activities

Corporate boards 
 Total S.A., Independent Member of the Board of Directors (since 2021)

Non-profit organizations 
 Trilateral Commission, Member of the European Group
 Foreign Trade France, Adviser
 Ecole nationale supérieure des mines de Paris, Member of the Board

He was:

 Member of the Improvement Committee for the Ecole nationale supérieure des mines de Paris

Honours
 Chevalier of the Legion of Honor
 Knight of the Ordre national du Mérite

References

External links
 Biography and photos on the Valeo Group's website

1954 births
Living people
Businesspeople from Lyon
French chief executives
Mines Paris - PSL alumni
Corps des mines
Chevaliers of the Légion d'honneur
Knights of the Ordre national du Mérite